American Safety Razor Company is a personal care brand founded in the early 20th century (1906) by a merging of the Gem Cutlery Company & Ever-Ready and has been a principal competitor to Gillette for a century and more. It is unrelated to the Gillette company which also used the name  'American Safety Razor Company'  in 1901 until 1904 before it was renamed for its founder, King C. Gillette.

The company produces a wide range of personal care, medical, industrial blades and cutting tools with international manufacturing operations in the Czech Republic, Germany, Israel, Mexico, and the United States.

History

Star Safety Razor
In 1870, Frederick, Otto and Richard Kampfe immigrated from Saxony, Germany establishing a tool and die shop in Brooklyn, New York. After becoming frustrated with shaving, Frederick modified a straight razor by shortening the blade and setting it in a frame. The device became known as Kampfe's rake and was produced for friends and customers at the New York shop. In 1875 the brothers formed the Star Safety Razor company and on June 15, 1880 were granted a U.S. patent for the Star Razor, the first safety razor produced in the United States.

Gem Cutlery Company
After 23 years working for the Kampfe Brothers Jerry Reichard starts the Gem Cutlery Company in 1898. Its first product, the Gem Safety Razor, borrowed heavily from the Star Razor in design but soon outpaced the Star in sales.

Ever-Ready
In 1903 Jerry Reichard leaves Gem Safety Razor Company to form yet another razor and blade producer, along with August Scheuber the company was briefly named 'Reichard & Scheuber Manufacturing Company' before it became 'The Yankee Company'. The Yankee Company made wedge-blade razors under the name Yankee, Mohican & Winner.
The Yankee Company, is renamed Ever-Ready in 1905. Gem & Ever-Ready merge in 1906 and is incorporated as the American Safety Razor Company. In 1906, abandoning the wedge-blade design, they introduced the standard single edge rib-back blade that is still used today. In 1915 Ever-Ready Shaving Brushes were first introduced and continued to be produced until the early 1990s.

Safetee Soap Corporation
In December 1919 The Safetee Soap Corporation formed as a subsidiary of American Safety Razor Corporation and produced a line of shaving soaps, creams, powders, talc and aftershave lotions to complement the safety razor business.
The Safetee Soap line was cross-promoted in pamphlets included in other ASR products.

American Safety Razor Corporation
Gem & Ever-Ready merged with Star to become the American Safety Razor Corporation in 1919. It was chartered in Virginia, while razor and blade production remained in Brooklyn. By 1921, it had produced 1,800,000 safety razors; 110,000,000 razor blades; 1,000,000 shaving brushes; 2,000,000 cakes of shaving soap.
By 1942, it had introduced and popularized the phrase five o'clock shadow. In 1953, it acquired the Pal, Treet and Personna brands after purchasing the Pal Blade Company. These latter two product names continue to be made today.
In 1954 the factory relocated to Staunton, Virginia, after the Brooklyn City Planning Commission's planned civic center encroached on the factory with plans to redevelop the industrial area into office and residential use.
The American Safety Razor factory building at 333 Jay Street then became the new campus for the Polytechnic Institute of Brooklyn.

Seeking diversification, Philip Morris acquired American Safety Razor in 1960. In 1963 American Safety Razor became the first maker of stainless steel blades, which were sold under the Personna brand name. In 1968, Philip Morris purchased the Burma-Vita Company, makers of Burma-Shave. In 1970, the first blade made with tungsten steel was introduced, the Personna 74. In 1974 American Line Brand of industrial products was introduced, expanding the company into industrial blades. In 1977, executives purchased Personna American Safety Razor Company from Philip Morris in a management buyout.

American Safety Razor filed for bankruptcy in July 2010, after declining earnings since 2008 and the loss of its largest customer Walmart earlier in 2010. Energizer Holdings bought American Safety Razor in November 2010 for US$301 million. In 2015, Energizer Holdings spun off the personal care division as Edgewell Personal Care. The company also announced its intention to cut back its industrial blade production or completely sell the personal care division. Edgewell announced the sale of its Personna Industrial Division to an investment group, which renamed it AccuTec Blades.

References

Manufacturing companies established in 1906
Companies based in Virginia
Personal care brands
1906 establishments in New York (state)
Edgewell Personal Care